Summer is a 2007 single by New York City synthpop band Shy Child.

Track listing

CD
 'Summer (Clean Radio Edit)'
 'Murder Capital'
 'Summer (South Central Remix)'
 'Summer (Mark One Remix)'
 'Summer (Seiji Remix)'
 'Summer (Infadels Remix)'
 'Summer (Album Version)'
 'Summer (Radio Edit)'

7"
A 'Summer'
B 'Murder Capital'

12"
A1 'Summer (South Central's Summer Revolution Mix)'
A2 'Summer (Seiji Remix)'
B1 'Summer (Infadels Remix)'
B2 'Noise Won't Stop (Buraka Som Sistema Remix)'

Chart positions

2007 singles
Wall of Sound (record label) singles
2007 songs